A partial solar eclipse occurred on October 31, 1902. A solar eclipse occurs when the Moon passes between Earth and the Sun, thereby totally or partly obscuring the image of the Sun for a viewer on Earth. A partial solar eclipse occurs in the polar regions of the Earth when the center of the Moon's shadow misses the Earth.

Related eclipses

Solar eclipses 1901–1902

Note: The partial solar eclipse of April 8, 1902, the annular solar eclipse of March 29, 1903 and the total solar eclipse of September 21, 1903 occur during the next lunar year set.

Notes

References

External links 

1902 in science
1902 10 31
October 1902 events